George Beckley may refer to:

George Charles Beckley (1787–1826), an English sea captain who became an advisor to Kamehameha I
George Charles Moʻoheau Beckley (1849–1910), Hawaiian seafarer, grandson of George Charles Beckley and director of the Wilder Steamship Company